Basic aluminium (or basic aluminum) is the name of more than one functional group consisting of aluminium with one or two hydroxy groups attached.

Dihydroxyaluminium, Al(OH)2, also known as dibasic aluminium, is monovalent, and known in these compounds:
Dihydroxyaluminium acetate, (HO)2AlCH3CO2, also known as aluminium monoacetate, basic aluminium monoacetate, dibasic aluminium acetate
Dihydroxyaluminium sodium carbonate
Aloglutamol, tris(hydroxymethyl)aminomethanegluconate dihydroxyaluminate
Aluminium monostearate
Carafate
Sucralfate

Hydroxyaluminium, Al(OH), also known as monobasic aluminium or basic aluminium, is divalent, and known in these compounds:
Hydroxyaluminium diacetate, HOAl(CH3CO2)2, also known as aluminium diacetate, basic aluminium diacetate, basic aluminium acetate, monobasic aluminium acetate

Aluminium, Al, is trivalent. Aluminium triacetate, Al(CH3CO2)3, is a complete molecule without any hydroxy groups, so it is not a "basic aluminum" compound.

Aluminium hydroxide, Al(OH)3, aluminium with three hydroxy groups attached, is a complete molecule, so it is not a "basic aluminum" compound.

Aluminium acetate is a name for three salts in the solid state: dihydroxyaluminium aluminium acetate, hydroxyaluminium diacetate, and aluminium triacetate, Al(CH3CO2)3. In aqueous solution, aluminium triacetate hydrolyses to form a mixture of the other two, so all solutions of all three can be referred to simply as "aluminium acetate", as the species co-exist and inter-convert in chemical equilibrium.

Aluminium compounds
Functional groups